The Belarus national handball team is the national handball team of Belarus.

In light of the launching of the 2022 Russian invasion of Ukraine, the European Handball Federation in February 2022 suspended Belarus both in competitions for national teams and on the club level. The International Handball Federation banned Belarus athletes and officials. Referees, officials, and commission members from Belarus will not be called upon for future activities.

Competitive record

World Championship

European Championship

* Colored background indicates that medal was won on the tournament.
** Red border color indicates that tournament was held on home soil.

Current squad
This is the list of 20 players named for the friendly games against Russia in March, 2023.

Statistics

Most appearances

Top scorers

Notable players
Sergei Gorbok (later Russia)
Andrej Klimovets (later Germany)
Siarhei Rutenka (interim Slovenia)
Aleksandr Tuchkin (later Russia)
Mikhail Yakimovich

References

External links

IHF profile

Men's national handball teams
Handball in Belarus
Handball